Derringer is an album by Derringer, released in 1976 on Blue Sky Records.

Track listing
 "Let Me In" (Rick Derringer, Cynthia Weil) – 3:31
 "You Can Have Me" (Derringer, Weil) – 4:23
 "Loosen Up Your Grip" (Derringer) – 6:39
 "Envy" (Derringer, Larry Sloman) – 4:40
 "Comes a Woman" (Derringer, Weil) – 5:29
 "Sailor" (Danny Johnson) – 4:25
 "Beyond the Universe" (Derringer) – 5:50
 "Goodbye Again" (Derringer, Weil) – 4:08

Personnel
Derringer
Rick Derringer – vocals, guitar
Danny Johnson – guitar, vocals
Kenny Aaronson – bass, background vocals
Vinny Appice – drums
Additional personnel
Edgar Winter – piano on "Goodbye Again"
Maeretha Stewart, Ray Simpson, Tasha Thomas – vocals on "Envy"
Harry Maslin – engineer

References 

1976 debut albums
Rick Derringer albums
Albums produced by Rick Derringer
Blue Sky Records albums